Tripterospermum is a genus of flowering plants belonging to the family Gentianaceae.

Its native range is Sakhalin to Tropical Asia.

Species:
 Tripterospermum alutaceofolium (T.S.Liu & C.C.Kuo) J.Murata 
 Tripterospermum australe J.Murata

References

Gentianaceae
Gentianaceae genera